Edward Gill or Ed Gill may refer to:

Edward K. Gill (1917–1985), American politician 
Edward Anthony Wharton Gill (1859–1944), English Canadian author and Anglican priest
Ed Gill (1895–1995), full name Edward James Gill, American professional baseball pitcher 
Ted Gill (1879–1923), full name Edward H. C. Gill, British politician and social activist
Edward Gill (MP), member of the Parliament of the United Kingdom in the 1650s

See also
Edmund Dwen Gill